Osnabrück Altstadt (formerly Osnabrück-Hasetor) is a railway station located in Osnabrück, Germany. The station is located on the Löhne–Rheine and the Oldenburg–Osnabrück lines. The train services are operated by Eurobahn, NordWestBahn, and WestfalenBahn.

Train services
The station is served by the following services:

Regional services  Wilhelmshaven - Varel - Oldenburg - Cloppenburg - Bramsche - Osnabrück
Regional services  Rheine - Osnabrück - Minden - Hanover - Braunschweig
Local services  Bad Bentheim - Rheine - Osnabrück - Herford - Bielefeld
Local services  Osnabrück - Bramsche - Vechta - Delmenhorst - Bremen

References

External links
 

Railway stations in Lower Saxony
Buildings and structures in Osnabrück